Dhurkot Nayagaun  is a town and municipality in Gulmi District in the Lumbini Zone of central Nepal. At the time of the 1991 Nepal census it had a population of 4692. This VDC is one of the most beautiful VDC of Gulmi and famous for Oranges. Literacy rate of this VDC is above 90℅. Politically above 75% people support Nepali Congress in this village. This VDC is touched by Arghakhanchi district.

References

External links
UN map of the municipalities of Gulmi District

Populated places in Gulmi District